Dhanraj Chandrasekaran is an Anglican bishop in the Church of South India: he has been Bishop of Trichy-Tanjore since 2018.

References

 

Anglican bishops of Trichy-Tanjore
Living people
21st-century Anglican bishops
Indian Christian religious leaders
Year of birth missing (living people)